Tom Okker and Marty Riessen were the defending champions but lost in the quarterfinals to Syd Ball and Kim Warwick.

Bob Hewitt and Frew McMillan won in the final 6–4, 6–0 against Brian Gottfried and Raúl Ramírez.

Seeds

Draw

Finals

Top half

Section 1

Section 2

Bottom half

Section 3

Section 4

References

External links
 ATP main draw
1977 US Open – Men's draws and results at the International Tennis Federation

Men's doubles
US Open (tennis) by year – Men's doubles